The Stackhat was a bicycle helmet widely available in Australia in the 1980s. It was originally designed as a generic sport safety helmet by CIG (Commonwealth Industrial Gases, now part of BOC) and then developed by Rosebank.  Due to government regulations and promotion by various State governments, the sturdy bright orange Stackhat had a near monopoly on bicycle helmets in the country for teenagers and children. Its distinctive design, initial release in a bright orange colour, ubiquitous ownership in the 1980s, and fast disappearance in the 1990s, have combined to make it a defining symbol of the 1980s for Australians. While the variety of helmet colours expanded throughout the years, the design did not.

Background
Australia was the first country to introduce national standards for bicycle helmet safety. The Stackhat was one of the first helmets to meet that proposed standard and was promoted heavily by State governments. An imaginative and colourful television campaign featuring Molly Meldrum riding through an early computer-generated model of the Sydney Harbour Bridge also cemented the helmet in popular imagination. The helmet was designed by PA Technology, Clayton (now Invetech), which was recognised with an Australian Design Award in 1986.

Appearance
The sturdy Stackhat was designed to emphasise safety over aerodynamics. Its appearance was more like something a crash test dummy would wear than an elite cyclist. This aesthetic was a selling point for the various governments promoting the device to safety-conscious parents.

The Stackhat is designed to protect the skull and temple and is light, comfortable, colourful and streamlined. The 'hi-tech' graphics are designed to appeal to the youth market. Made from impact-modified and shock absorbent expanded polystyrene it is designed for use in sporting and leisure activities including cycling, cricket, equestrian and skiing.

The Stackhat is significant as it was one of the first helmets designed in Australia to comply with the Australian Standard 2063.

The helmet was initially only available in orange but after several years other colours, including black, white and pink became available.

Naming
The Stackhat derives its name from the verb "stack", which is an Australian slang term meaning "crash."

References

External links
 http://www.rosebank.com.au/about-us/

1980s fashion
Bicycle helmets
Cycling in Australia